() is the rank held by company-grade officers in some East Asian militaries. The ranks are used in both the People's Republic of China and the Republic of China on Taiwan, and both North and South Korea.

Chinese variant

People's Liberation Army 

Republic of China Armed Forces

Korean variant

North Korea

South Korea

See also

Jiang (rank)
Xiao (rank)
Ranks of the People's Liberation Army
Ranks of the People's Liberation Army Navy
Ranks of the People's Liberation Army Air Force
Republic of China Armed Forces rank insignia

References

Military ranks of the People's Republic of China
Military of the Republic of China